Great Barrington may refer to:

Places
Great Barrington, Gloucestershire, a village in England
Great Barrington, Massachusetts, a town in the United States
Great Barrington (CDP), Massachusetts, the main village in the town

Document
Great Barrington Declaration, a 2020 open letter generally opposing COVID-19 lockdowns and restrictions